The Uzbek Khanate ( or Oʻzbek ulusi / Ўзбек  хонлиги or Ўзбек Улуси), also known as the Abulkhair Khanate was a Shaybanid state preceding the Khanate of Bukhara. During the few years it existed, the Uzbek Khanate was the preeminent state in Central Asia, ruling over most of modern-day Uzbekistan, much of Kazakhstan and Turkmenistan, and parts of southern Russia. This is the first state of the Abulkhairids, a branch of the Shaybanids.

Etymology

The dynasty of Abu'l-Khayr Khan and his descendants is named after him, and the states ruled by them are known as Abulkhairids, such as in the Khanate of Bukhara. They may also be referred to as Shaybanids, although this is more of an umbrella term as a rival dynasty called the Arabshahids of Khwarezm were also Shaybanids, but not Abulkhairids.

History

Before Abu'l-Khayr Khan

Starting with Shiban, brother of Batu Khan who was the ruler of the Golden Horde, the Shaybanids and their descendants held land and sway over many tribes granted to Shiban by Batu. These lands included the Golden Horde domains east of the Urals, and lands north of the Syr Darya river.
Central control in the Golden Horde eroded away quickly in the east and breakaway states like the Nogai Horde and the Khanate of Sibir appeared in the region.

Abu'l-Khayr Khan

By the time of Abu'l-Khayr's birth in 1412, the ulus of Shiban was fractured. At this time the eastern part of the Golden Horde (Blue Horde) had become outside of complete control of the Golden Horde khans and pretenders, especially after the assassination of Barak Khan in 1427. Abu'l-Khayr was taken prisoner after a battle in 1427 and was released in 1428. After the passing of the then Khan of the Uzbeks and pretender to the throne of the Golden Horde, Barak Khan, Ulug Beg, the leader of the Timurid Empire, secretly orchestrated the title of khan to pass to Abu'l-Khayr. He began his rule by consolidating tribes in Siberia around his capital at Chimgi-Tura (Modern-day Tyumen). He was able to depose the reigning Khan of Sibir,  Hajji Muhammad, a former khan of the Golden Horde from 1419 to 1423, and took the entirety of the area under Shaybanid control.

In 1430 or 1431, Abu'l-Khayr and his army marched south into Timurid-held Khwarezm and occupied Urganj. Between 1430 and 1446 the Uzbek Khanate took land in Transoxiana from the Timurids.

Abu'l-Khayr invaded the Golden Horde sometime after this and defeated Mustafa Khan near Astrakhan. The Uzbeks lost around 4,500 men during this campaign.

Prior to the death of Shah Rukh in 1448 Sighnaq and other cities in Turan such as Uzkend and Sozak were invaded and captured by the Uzbeks. Sighnaq became one of the principal cities of Central Asia during this time.

In 1451, Abu'l-Khayr allied with the Timurid Abu Sa'id against his rival 'Abdullah and the two both marched on Samarkand. The Uzbek-Abu Sa'id alliance was successful and in return Abu Sa'id paid tribute to the Uzbeks.

Kazakh Insurrection

Starting in the 1460s, the Kazakh khans warred for control of modern-day Kazakhstan, led by Janibeg and Kerei Khan, the sons of the claimant to the throne of the Golden Horde, Barak Khan, founded the Kazakh Khanate. This war was made especially difficult for the Uzbeks because of a recent war with the Dorben Oirat Mongols on the Uzbeks' eastern borders. Janibeg and Kerei sought to capitalize on Uzbek weakness following the conflict.

Regarding these events, 16th century Khaidar Duglati in his Tarikh-i Rashidi reports:

Death of Abu'l-Khayr Khan and Successors

Somewhere around 1468–1470, Abu'l-Khayr Khan died in battle against the Kazakhs along with several of his sons. Sheikh Haidar, also known as Baruj Oghlan (Some sources have them as the same person or different persons), the eldest of Abu'l-Khayr's sons, succeeded him. Sheikh Haidar's reign was short and was ended after conflicts with a rival khan, Ibak.

Muhammad Shaybani, Abu'l-Khayr's grandson, succeeded his father, Sheikh Haidar. Shaybani had been, along with his brother, Mahmud Sultan, given refuge by the Khan of Astrakhan, Qasim.

After Shaybani was helped by the Moghul Khans to reclaim land in Transoxiana, he became a Moghul vassal from 1488 until around 1500. After this point, Shaybani led his own conquests which largely consisted of cities in the fractured Timurid successor states (Such as Samarkand and Bukhara). Shaybani's main rivals were the Timurid Babur and the Persian Shah Ismail.

In 1500, Shaybani officially conceded all the Kazakh held lands in Dasht-i Qipchaq to the Kazakh Khanate. Shortly after this in 1506, Shaybani captured Bukhara and the Uzbek Khanate became the Khanate of Bukhara.

Muhammad Shaybani was killed in the Battle of Marv by the Safavids ruled by Shah Ismail in 1510, and had his skull turned into a jeweled drinking goblet.

Rulers

Khans of Shaybanid Domains

These are the khans ruling over the domains of the Uzbeks prior to the Abulkhairids.

 Shiban
 Bahadur Oghul
 Jochi Buqa
 Bad Oghul
 Mengu Timur Oghlan
 Fulad Oghul
 Ibrahim Sultan
 Dawlat Shaykh Oghlan

Abulkhairids
 Abu'l-Khayr Khan, son of Dawlat Shaykh Oghlan
 Sheikh Haidar, son of Abu'l-Khayr, died in battle in 1471 against Ibak Khan
 Muhammad Shaybani, grandson of Abu'l-Khayr Khan

See also
 Khanate of Bukhara
 Khanate of Khiva
 Khanate of Kokand
 Shaybanids
 Timeline of the Uzbeks

References 

Uzbeks
Khanate of Bukhara
Mongol dynasties